The women's individual competition of the bowling events at the 2011 Pan American Games will take place between the 24 and 27 of October at the Bolearmo Tapatio. The defending Pan American Games champion is Tennelle Milligan of the United States, while the defending Pan American Championship champion is Karen Marcano of Venezuela.

Qualification round
In the qualification round, the bowlers are ranked according to their performance across twelve bowling games. The top sixteen bowlers advance to the knockout round.

Playoffs

References

Bowling at the 2011 Pan American Games